The Protect and Preserve International Cultural Property Act  is a United States Act of Congress that became law in 2016.

Provisions
The bill urges the President (Barack Obama at the time) to establish an interagency coordinating committee to "advance executive branch efforts to protect and preserve international cultural property at risk from political instability, armed conflict, or natural or other disasters".

It also establishes the President should apply import restrictions specifically targeting archaeological or ethnological material from Syria. Such restrictions include those for "illicit import, export, and transfer of ownership of cultural property" (adopted by the UNESCO).

The President is to determine yearly whether at least one of the following is met: 1) "Syria is incapable of fulfilling the requirements to request an agreement pursuant to the Convention on Cultural Property Implementation Act; 2) "it would be against the U.S. national interest to enter into such an agreement".

Import restrictions may be waived for "specified cultural property if the President certifies to Congress that": 1) "the foreign owner or custodian of the specified cultural property" requests it be temporarily located in the US for protection; 2) the property is to be returned upon request to its foreign owner or custodian; 3) grants of waivers do not contribute to illegal trafficking in "cultural property or financing of criminal or terrorist activities".

Archaeological or ethnological material entering the US pursuant to a waiver shall have immunity from seizure under P.L. 89-259.

Finally, the President is to report to Congress annually "on executive branch efforts to protect and preserve international cultural property".

References

Acts of the 114th United States Congress